Enrico Cotza (born 3 July 1988 in Cagliari) is an Italian footballer who plays as a midfielder.

Career
Cotza has made four senior appearances for Cagliari so far in his career; his Serie A debut being on the receiving end of a 5–1 drubbing against Fiorentina in December 2007.

On 1 September 2008, Cotza joined Foligno in third-tier Prima Divisione on loan for the remainder of the 2008-09 season.

On 1 February 2010 he was loaned to Alghero where he met ex-teammates Alessio Cossu, Andrea Cocco, Andrea Peana and Simone Aresti.  In June 2010 the club signed him to a co-ownership deal. After the club was expelled from the professional league, he joined Villacidrese in a co-ownership deal.

References

External links
 Cagliari Calcio Official Player Profile

1988 births
Living people
Italian footballers
Cagliari Calcio players
S.S. Villacidrese Calcio players
Serie A players
Association football midfielders
Sportspeople from Cagliari
Footballers from Sardinia
Pol. Alghero players